Count Your Blessings is the debut studio album by British rock band Bring Me the Horizon. Recorded at DEP International Studios in Birmingham with producer Dan Sprigg, it was originally released in the United Kingdom on 30 October 2006 by Visible Noise. The album was later issued by Earache Records in the United States on 14 August 2007. Count Your Blessings was supported by the release of music videos for two of the album's tracks: "Pray for Plagues" on 4 June 2007 and "For Stevie Wonder's Eyes Only (Braille)" on 6 March 2008.

Named after a lyric in the album's opening song "Pray for Plagues", Count Your Blessings is representative of the band's early deathcore sound, which was phased out on later releases and eventually abandoned in favour of other, less aggressive styles. The band members were young when they recorded the album, and the band has largely disregarded it later in their career; it began as early as 2008, when guitarist Lee Malia was already criticising the album's quality. Most of the songs on the record quickly faded from the band's live setlists. Most band members recorded their parts individually, rather than the group doing so as a whole, with the central location of the studio credited as "a distraction." The album received some negative reviews, with the main complaints revolving around musical originality, although it still reached number 93 on the UK Albums Chart.

Background and recording
Following the release of their first extended play This Is What the Edge of Your Seat Was Made For in October 2004, Bring Me the Horizon toured extensively while writing new material for their full-length debut album. Due to the number of shows the band were playing at the time, much of the material was written quickly before recording was due to begin – drummer Matt Nicholls claimed that three songs were written in the space of two days due to the upcoming deadline. A number of songs are re-recordings of early demos that the band had taped for a project titled The Bedroom Sessions and in a broadcast session for the UK station Radio 1, namely "(I Used to Make Out With) Medusa", "Off the Heezay" and "Liquor & Love Lost" (then known as "Dragon Slaying").

Recording took place at DEP International Studios in Birmingham with producer Dan Sprigg, who had previously worked with bands including Cradle of Filth, Napalm Death and, more recently, Lostprophets. Frontman Oliver Sykes described the recording process as "an intense experience" due to the group's desire to make the best debut album they could, with biographer Ben Welch claiming that they "were starting to feel the pressure of all of the hype that was building around them" at the time. Due to the studio's location in the centre of the city, the young band members (all under 20 years old at the time) were often distracted and would not spend much time in the studio; this meant that each individual member ended up recording the majority of their contributions to the album alone, rather than the full unit performing together.

Composition

Influences, style and themes
When recording Count Your Blessings, Bring Me the Horizon intended to make an album which sounded "as heavy and brutal as they possibly could"; Welch claims that the band scrapped any song ideas that "didn't fit that criterion". Speaking in 2014 about the band's intentions when writing and recording music during their early years, Sykes claimed the group "just wanted to make noisy music". Similarly, when asked about the band's beginnings in a 2014 interview, guitarist Lee Malia explained, "When you're young, you just want to do everything to extremes. That's what the first EP and the album were like: too over-excited sounding". Matt Nicholls said that on Count Your Blessings, Bring Me the Horizon "were influenced a lot by Swedish metal – At The Gates and stuff like that." Nicholls also said that on Count Your Blessings, Bring Me the Horizon's members "were 18 or 19 years old and wanted to be as metal as possible." Specifically, the band's members were influenced by Norma Jean, Skycamefalling, Metallica, Pantera, At the Gates, Arch Enemy, The Dillinger Escape Plan, and In Flames at the band's beginning.

The musical style of Count Your Blessings is most often categorised as deathcore, but has also been labeled as metalcore and melodic death metal. Count Your Blessings uses elements of genres like melodic death metal, death metal and black metal, drawing comparisons to bands like The Black Dahlia Murder, Cannibal Corpse,  At the Gates, and Obituary. Last Rites noted that the album's black metal-reminiscent vocals (which consist of death growls and high-pitched shrieks) were placed over a musical base of melodic death metal. According to Drowned in Sound columnist Raziq Rauf, the songs on the album "generally consist of The Black Dahlia Murder-style thunderous riffs mixed with some dastardly sludgy doom moments and more breakdowns than your dad's old Nissan Sunny". The lyrical content is admittedly simple, which according to Sykes is due to the fact that his life had "never been that bad" at the time he wrote them; the singer has noted that most songs on the album are "about girls or just growing up", which he claims contributes to the group's brand of "party music".

Promotion and release
Count Your Blessings was originally released in the United Kingdom on 30 October 2006 by Visible Noise. It was not released in the United States until 14 August 2007, when it was issued by Earache Records. The version released by retailer Hot Topic featured a cover version of Slipknot's "Eyeless" as a bonus track, which had originally been recorded for Higher Voltage: Another Brief History of Rock, a CD released for free with an issue of Kerrang! magazine in June 2007. A first music video for "Pray for Plagues", was directed by Kenny Lindström and released on 4 June 2007. A second music video, directed by Perrone Salvatore, "For Stevie Wonder's Eyes Only (Braille)" was issued on 6 March 2008.

Following the release of Count Your Blessings, Bring Me the Horizon toured extensively in support of the album. Throughout October and November the group toured the UK with American black metal band Abigail Williams, although the Phoenix, Arizona-based band left the tour early on after drummer Zach Gibson suffered a wrist injury. Centurion replaced Abigail Williams for the remainder of the tour, and Bring Me the Horizon spent the rest of the year supporting labelmates Lostprophets. The band later replaced Bury Your Dead supporting Killswitch Engage on their European tour in January 2007, then continued to tour the UK through March and April. During the summer, the band played a number of festivals (including Download Festival).

Critical reception

Upon its release, Count Your Blessings debuted at number 93 on the UK Albums Chart. It also peaked at number 9 on the UK Rock & Metal Albums Chart and remained there for two further weeks, first dropping to number 14 and then to number 26.

Overall, Count Your Blessings received mixed critical reception. Exclaim! writer Bill Whish wrote positively about the release, praising the "vitriolic lyrics and brutally heavy guitar work" and welcoming the band as "a little more interesting" than some other metalcore artists. DIY magazine's Tom Connick dubbed "(I Used to Make Out With) Medusa" the "crowning jewel" of Count Your Blessings in a 2014 feature, claiming that it "Perfectly [captures] that youthful, drunken recklessness that defined [the band's] most controversial years" with its "razor sharp" guitar work and "thunderous breakdowns". Aaron McKay, a writer for Chronicles of Chaos, praised Sykes' vocal delivery, likening it to Obituary frontman John Tardy.

However, many commentators criticised the lack of invention on the album. While AllMusic's Stewart Mason praised the album for being "vaguely interesting musically" as well as claiming that there is "a greater sense of dynamic than usual" in the genre on the release, he also commented on the "generally unimaginative songwriting", claiming it adds "little to the existing knowledge base" of the genre. Furthermore, he also criticised Sykes's vocal style on the record, which he described as an "immediately irritating" and a "high-pitched gibber". Chad Bowar for About.com highlighted the band within their scene, praising their "catchy melodies" and "decent riffs and solos", and on Count Your Blessings welcomed the variety in styles of vocal delivery across the collection. However, similarly to Mason, Bowar dubbed the album "way too generic and repetitive", claiming that it features "too many breakdowns" and a majority of "extremely forgettable" songs. Axl Rosenberg of MetalSucks complained that the band displayed "nothing to distinguish them from the pack" on the album, although he did praise the presence of "some decent breakdowns" and claim that the songs would make "good background noise".

Impact
Due to the young age of the band when they recorded the album and the drastic stylistic changes which followed its release, Count Your Blessings has largely been neglected in recent years, both by the band and by their fans. As early as 2008, guitarist Lee Malia was criticising the album's quality and noting that the band quickly wanted "to do something better" after its release. Following the release of "Drown" in 2014, described by Digital Spys Adam Silverstein as "a universe away from the ... full-on commotion" of Count Your Blessings, Sykes reflected that the single would have "offended" the band members when they were younger, adding that the group were "never gonna sound like that again".

Keyboardist Jordan Fish (who joined Bring Me the Horizon about 6 years after the album's release) has explained the drastic evolution in style between Count Your Blessings and later releases as simply being due to the fact that the band members "don't listen to deathcore anymore", claiming that to attempt that type of music again would be dishonest due to the members' change in tastes and feelings. Alternative Press writer Tyler Sharp has added that "The members of Bring Me the Horizon have evolved from teenage metalheads to a group of mature, progressed songwriters" in response to criticism of their change in style. Most of the album's songs were dropped from live performances in the years following the release of Suicide Season and There Is a Hell..., although "Pray for Plagues" returned to set lists briefly in late 2014 when the band performed with original guitarist Curtis Ward at a few shows. The song is featured on the video album Live at Wembley, recorded in December 2014.

Despite the radical evolution of the band since Count Your Blessings, the album has still received some retrospective praise. In a feature published in 2015, Kerrang! writer Emily Carter credited the album for increasing the popularity of the band during their formative years, as well as praising its guitar riffs and the song "Pray for Plagues". AXS contributor Rey Harris described the album as "a classic among deathcore fans", highlighting "Black & Blue" in particular. Sarai C. of Loudwire named "Pray for Plagues" the fourth best Bring Me the Horizon song to date (as of May 2014), praising it as "one of Bring Me the Horizon's most timeless tracks". Dan Slessor for Alternative Press included "Tell Slater Not to Wash His Dick" as the alternative tenth choice in his feature of "The 10 best Bring Me the Horizon songs", praising its "exuberant energy and rich melody".

Track listing
All lyrics written by Oliver Sykes; all songs produced by Bring Me the Horizon and Dan Sprigg.

Notes
 Track 2 is censored on the tracklist as "D**k", but without censoring in the booklet.
 Track 3 is written in incorrect braille on the tracklist, and in correct braille (as ⠋⠕⠗ ⠎⠞⠑⠧⠊⠑ ⠺⠕⠝⠙⠑⠗⠎ ⠑⠽⠑⠎ ⠕⠝⠇⠽) in the booklet. It is commonly known as "For Stevie Wonder's Eyes Only (Braille)" or simply as "Braille".
 Track 4 is written as "Alot Like Vegas" on the tracklist. This was corrected on later versions.
 Track 11 is written as "Eyeless (Slipknot)" on the tracklist.

Personnel
Credits adapted from the liner notes of Count Your Blessings, Visible Noise

Bring Me the Horizon
 Oliver Sykes – lead vocals, keyboards, programming
 Lee Malia – lead guitar
 Curtis Ward – rhythm guitar
 Matt Kean – bass guitar
 Matt Nicholls – drums. percussion, programming

Additional personnel
 Bring Me the Horizon – production, music
 Dan Sprigg – production, mixing, mastering
 Tom Barnes – photography

Charts

Release history

References

External links

Count Your Blessings at YouTube (streamed copy where licensed)

2006 debut albums
Bring Me the Horizon albums
Earache Records albums
Visible Noise albums